Count Imre Csáky de Körösszeg et Adorján (16 February 1882 – 22 May 1961) was a Hungarian politician, who served as Minister of Foreign Affairs in 1920. His father was Albin Csáky, a former Minister of Education.

Having completed his studies at the Vienna Orientalistic Academy (later Consular Academy) he joined the diplomatic service and served successively in Dresden, Saint Petersburg, Berlin, Bucharest and Warsaw.

He was instrumental in negotiating the peace treaty of Brest-Litovsk and of the Treaty of Bucharest (1918). He was a member of the Hungarian peace delegation of 1920. As such he conducted negotiations, among others, with Maurice Paléologue, the French secretary of the Ministry of Foreign Affairs.

Csáky was appointed Minister of Foreign Affairs in the Teleki government. He resigned two months later.

Imre Csáky was persecuted after the collapse of Horthy's Hungary, and even more so spending many years in jail during Communism.

He died on the Canary Islands on his way to exile in Venezuela.

Autobiography 

 Eva-Marie Csáky (editor) Vom Geachteten zum Geächteten Böhlau, Wien, 1992.

References 
 Magyar Életrajzi Lexikon

1882 births
1961 deaths
People from Levoča District
Hungarians in Slovakia
Foreign ministers of Hungary
Imre, Csaky